Good Luck Chuck is a 2007 comedy film starring Dane Cook and Jessica Alba, with screenplay by Josh Stolberg and directorial debut by long-time film editor Mark Helfrich. In the film, women find their "one true love" after having sex with a dentist named Chuck (Cook).  Chuck meets a girl named Cam (Alba) and tries to become her true love. The film opened in theaters on September 21, 2007, and was panned by critics. One of Good Luck Chucks theatrical posters parodied the well-known Rolling Stone cover photographed by Annie Leibovitz featuring John Lennon and Yoko Ono in similar poses.

Plot
While playing spin the bottle / seven minutes in heaven at a party in 1985, 10-year-old Charlie "Chuck" Logan refuses the sexual advances of a goth girl named Anisha Carpenter. In retaliation, she places a hex on him, saying that once a girl has been with him, "to the next she will be true".

In the present, Chuck is a successful dentist, running a practice in the office opposite his best friend Stu's plastic surgery business. While being sexually intimate with his girlfriend Carol, Chuck cannot reply that he loves her too, prompting her to immediately break up with him. 

Stu and Chuck attend the wedding of one of Chuck's ex-girlfriends, Katie. During the reception, Katie toasts Chuck for being her lucky charm, which gains the interest of his female tablemates. Chuck becomes enamored with Cam Wexler, an unusually clumsy, yet attractive and friendly penguin scientist working at a marine mammal park.

The next day, Chuck's office is full of women. He asks Stu if anything's different about him; they also find that Carol is engaged thanks to Chuck being a lucky charm. His date that evening wants to have sex with him because of the charm, but he gets an emergency call from Cam, who chipped her tooth in a work accident at the penguin exhibit. 

Chuck fixes her tooth, but instead of accepting monetary payment, he asks her out for dinner, but Cam declines as she is not emotionally ready. He returns home to find his receptionist Reba coming onto him hoping he will be her lucky charm.

Stu encourages Chuck to indulge in more "guilt-free sex", and Chuck does so. However, he still has feelings for Cam, and asks her out. Chuck and Cam's relationship deepens, but when Stu calls Chuck and tells him that every single woman Chuck had slept with has gotten married, Chuck gets cold feet and leaves.

Stu and Chuck test the curse on an ugly, morbidly obese woman named Eleanor. Meanwhile, Chuck pretends to be sick and maintains a distance relationship with Cam by phone and by computer video. Observing that Eleanor has not seen anyone, Chuck makes Stu ask her out. After Stu confirms he did that and that Eleanor hasn't fallen for him, Chuck rushes to Cam's place and they have sex. 

The next morning, when Chuck sees Eleanor on TV happily kissing another man, he angrily calls Stu, who admits he only pretended to ask her out. Worried that Cam will now find her true love, he smothers her in increasingly annoying ways, until she eventually dumps him. While talking with Reba, Chuck sees a bottle spinning on the ground; he and Stu locate Anisha's home. Chuck asks Anisha to dismiss the curse, but Anisha reveals to Chuck that the curse was not truly real, and that her love back then was just a childhood crush. She encourages him to let go of the girl he is interested in, if he truly loves her.

Chuck arranges for Cam to meet Howard Blaine, the penguin expert author that she admires. Later, Stu and his new three-breasted fiancée Lara tell Chuck that Cam is heading to Antarctica with Howard. Chuck catches her on the plane and pleads her not to go, but Cam explains that she will be back on Wednesday and she is going with both Howard and his wife. 

Chuck leaves Cam with a ring box with a pebble, a reference to a previous discussion about what a penguin would do to court a lifetime mate. She calls back for him and they kiss. Meanwhile, Anisha pulls out her old childhood occult keepsake box, and removes a pin from a voodoo doll of Chuck. A year later, Chuck and Cam are in Antarctica together looking at the southern lights while surrounded by penguins.

During the closing credits, the housesitting Stu and Lara find a sex tape involving Chuck, Cam, and a stuffed penguin.

Cast

 Dane Cook as Dr. Charlie Logan
 Connor Price as Young Charlie
 Jessica Alba as Cam Wexler
 Dan Fogler as Dr. Stuart Klaminsky
 Troy Gentile as Young Stu
 Ellia English as Reba
 Sasha Pieterse as Young Anisha Carpenter (credited as Goth Girl)
 Michelle Harrison as Anisha Carpenter
 Lonny Ross as Joe Wexler, Cam's stoner brother who works with her at the marine mammal park
 Chelan Simmons as Carol

Reception
Good Luck Chuck was panned by critics. According to Rotten Tomatoes, only 5% of critics gave the film positive reviews, based on 114 reviews. The site's consensus states: "A shortage of laughs and an undercurrent of mean-spiritedness undermine Good Luck Chuck, squandering a decent premise on gross-out humor and shopworn slapstick." On Metacritic, the film had an average score of 19 out of 100, based on 23 reviews, indicating "overwhelming dislike".

Roger Ebert awarded the film 1 out of 4 stars, branding it "potty-mouthed and brain-damaged", whilst his reviewing partner, Richard Roeper also rated it poorly.

British film critic Mark Kermode named it the worst film of 2007.

Box office
The film was the second-highest-grossing film at the U.S. box office in its opening weekend, grossing $13.6 million in 2,612 theaters. The film went on to have a total box office tally of approximately $35 million U.S. and $24 million foreign.

Accolades
The film earned two Razzie Award nominations including Worst Actress (Jessica Alba) and Worst Screen Couple (Alba and Dane Cook), but lost to Lindsay Lohan for I Know Who Killed Me.

Production
Good Luck Chuck was filmed from late-September to mid-November 2006. The film was shot in Vancouver, British Columbia, and also partly in Edmonton, Alberta, using the Alberta Film Studio for the aquarium scenes and the neighborhood of Old Strathcona for exterior shots.

Soundtrack
The soundtrack was released on 18 September 2007.
 "I Was Zapped by the Lucky Super Rainbow" (Flaming Lips)
 "Accident Prone" (The Honorary Title)
 "Good Luck Chuck" (The Dandy Warhols)
 "Love It When You Call" – Cherrytree House Version (The Feeling)
 "Good Weekend" (Art Brut)
 "Hurry Up Let's Go" (Shout Out Louds)
 "Shut Me Out" (Aidan Hawken) – 2:49
 "You're Gonna Get It" (Sharon Jones & The Dap-Kings)
 "The Whistle Song" (Pepper)
 "You Might Think" (The Cars)
 "Physical" (Olivia Newton-John)
 "Bela Lugosi's Dead" (Bauhaus)
 "Crazy in Love" (Antique Gold)

References

External links
 
 
 
 
 
 

2007 films
2007 romantic comedy films
2000s sex comedy films
American romantic comedy films
American sex comedy films
Canadian romantic comedy films
Canadian sex comedy films
Casual sex in films
Films about curses
Films about Voodoo
Films about witchcraft
English-language Canadian films
2000s English-language films
Films about dentistry
Films scored by Aaron Zigman
Films set in 1985
Films shot in Edmonton
Films shot in Vancouver
Films with screenplays by Josh Stolberg
Lionsgate films
2007 directorial debut films
2000s American films
2000s Canadian films